Arrhenia spathulata is a mushroom-forming fungus in the family Hygrophoraceae. Found in Europe, it is widespread along the Atlantic coast.

References

External links

Fungi described in 1828
Fungi of Europe
Hygrophoraceae
Taxa named by Elias Magnus Fries